Brady Canfield Scott (born June 30, 1999) is an American professional soccer player who plays as a goalkeeper for Major League Soccer club Columbus Crew.

Youth
Born in Petaluma, California, Scott began playing recreational soccer at the age of six. He first began playing with the Sonoma County Alliance before joining Marin FC. While at Marin FC, Scott also occasionally played striker.

Club career
Scott then joined De Anza Force before moving to Germany.
While with Sonoma County Alliance, Scott had a trial with Dutch Eredivisie side Vitesse and prior to moving to Germany, he was offered a scholarship to play college soccer for the Virginia Cavaliers.

1. FC Köln
In July 2017, Scott signed with German Bundesliga club 1. FC Köln. He made his first appearance for the first-team on August 12, 2017 in the DFB-Pokal against Leher TS. He was an unused substitute as Köln won 5–0. Scott then made his competitive debut for the club's reserve side, 1. FC Köln II in the Regionalliga West on August 20, 2017 against Rot-Weiss Essen. He was the starter as his side were defeated 3–0.
He failed to make a professional appearance for 1. FC Köln.

Nashville SC
On August 17, 2020, Scott returned to the United States, signing with Major League Soccer side Nashville SC.

Sacramento Republic (loan)
Eight days after signing with Nashville SC, Scott was loaned out to USL Championship side Sacramento Republic on August 25, 2020. He made his professional debut for Sacramento Republic on September 20, 2020, starting against Tacoma Defiance in a match that ended 3–3.

Austin FC
On December 15, 2020, Scott was selected from Nashville SC by Austin FC in the 2020 MLS Expansion Draft. Following the 2021 season, Scott's contract option was declined by Austin.

Memphis 901 (loan)
On May 14, 2021, Scott joined USL Championship side Memphis 901 on loan for the 2021 season. He made his debut for the club on June 19 in a 1–0 home defeat against OKC Energy.

Columbus Crew
On January 14, 2022, Scott signed a one-year deal with two option years with the Columbus Crew after they acquired his rights with the fourth pick in Stage 2 of the 2021 MLS Re-Entry Draft.

International career
Scott has played for various United States youth national teams since 2014. In 2016, he helped the United States under-18 side to the 2016 Vaclav Jezek tournament title, while personally winning the tournament's Golden Glove. Tab Ramos named him to the United States under-20 for the 2019 FIFA U-20 World Cup.

Career statistics

Club

Honors
Columbus Crew 2
MLS Next Pro: 2022

United States U20
CONCACAF U-20 Championship: 2018

Individual
CONCACAF Under-20 Championship Best XI: 2018
CONCACAF Under-20 Championship Golden Glove: 2018

References

External links
Profile at the USSF website

1999 births
Living people
People from Petaluma, California
Soccer players from California
American soccer players
Association football goalkeepers
1. FC Köln players
Nashville SC players
Sacramento Republic FC players
Austin FC players
Memphis 901 FC players
Columbus Crew players
USL Championship players
American expatriate soccer players
United States men's under-20 international soccer players
Columbus Crew 2 players
MLS Next Pro players
De Anza Force players